Quiz Kids (sometimes  Puzzler Quiz Kids) is a children's puzzle magazine. Launched in 1987, it is the longest-running magazine of this genre. Based in the UK, each issue comprises crosswords, dot-to-dots, spot the differences, word searches, and various other challenges created for children aged 7–12. The puzzles are created specially for the magazine, in line with the guidelines of the UK's National Curriculum.  Quiz Kids is published every 2nd Month. It is also published in New Zealand.

Characters

The plots in Quiz Kids centre around the adventures of five main characters: Bee (a girl), Simon (a boy), Mutt (a dog), Paws (a cat) and Streetwise (a mouse). Each issue, the Quizkids embark on a new adventure, and must use their puzzle-solving skills to achieve their goals.

Secondary characters who occasionally feature in the magazine to help the Quizkids include Tom Boffin (Bee and Simon's uncle), and Spider and Dewie (a junior reporter and junior photographer respectively, who work for the newspaper Scoop!).

Book
A companion book, The Puzzler Quiz Kids Adventures was released by Carlton Books in May 2006. The book comprised five Quiz Kids stories: "Jungle Adventure", "Quiz Kids and the Black Shark", "Animal Farm Adventure", "Quiz Kids Adventure Camp" and "Quiz Kids Funfair Adventure".

References

Children's magazines published in the United Kingdom
Bi-monthly magazines published in the United Kingdom
Magazines established in 1987
Puzzle magazines
1987 establishments in the United Kingdom
Quarterly magazines published in the United Kingdom
Monthly magazines published in the United Kingdom
Magazines published in London